Sarawut Yodyinghathaikul (born March 6, 1999) is a Thai professional footballer who plays as a right-back.

Honours

Club
Chiangrai United
 Thai FA Cup (1): 2020–21

References

External links
 

1999 births
Living people
Sarawut Yodyinghathaikul
Sarawut Yodyinghathaikul
Association football defenders
Sarawut Yodyinghathaikul
Sarawut Yodyinghathaikul